Logan Township is the name of three townships in the U.S. state of Indiana:

 Logan Township, Dearborn County, Indiana
 Logan Township, Fountain County, Indiana
 Logan Township, Pike County, Indiana

Indiana township disambiguation pages